Saurabh Sachdeva is an Indian actor and acting coach. He started his film career in Maroon, which was released in 2016.  He received critical acclaim for his character Suleiman Isa in the Netflix  series Sacred Games in 2018. A veteran acting coach, he trained an array of B-town stars including Rana Daggubati, Harshvardhan Rane, Freida Pinto, Varun Dhawan, Raghav Juyal, Kubbra Sait, Richa Chadha, Dulquer Salmaan, Tripti Dimri, Avinash Tiwary , Arjun Kapoor, Jacqueline Fernandez, Vani Kapoor, Asha Negi, Shakti Mohan, Rithvik Dhanjani, Mandana Karimi.

He appeared in Manmarziyan , Laalkaptaan, and Housefull 4. Recently seen as an antagonist in Vadh, which stars Neena Gupta and Sanjay Mishra.

In 2016, he directed a short film Gul which raises a question of priorities and showed at the Kerala International Film Festival. In 2017, Saurabh founded his own education and training institute The Actors Truth and theatre group Antarang in Mumbai.

Early life 
Saurabh Sachdeva was born on 24 September 1978 in Haldwani. He studied at Model Sr Secondary School Saket, Delhi. In 2001 he joined Barry John's Imago Acting School (now known as Barry John Acting Studio) in 2001 where he started teaching in 2002. He worked with Imago Theatre Group until 2003 where he conceived and acted in street plays. In 2005, he joined Barry John Acting School in Mumbai where he spent 11 years as an Acting Coach.

Filmography

References

External links 
 
 
 
 

Living people
Indian actors
Year of birth missing (living people)